Filipino singer Regine Velasquez has headlined concerts and performed live at award ceremonies and on television specials. Her first live television performance came when she competed in the reality television talent show Ang Bagong Kampeon (1984), which she won with a performance of George Benson's "In Your Eyes". She released her first single, "Love Me Again", in 1986, under the name Chona. Since adopting the stage name Regine Velasquez, she appeared in televised performances on The Penthouse Live! and Triple Treat. She represented the Philippines at the 1989 Asia-Pacific Singing Contest, performing "You'll Never Walk Alone" and "And I Am Telling You I'm Not Going". She was a guest act for several performers, including Pops Fernandez, Kuh Ledesma, Martin Nievera and Gary Valenciano, and her debut concert "Regine at 17" was held at the Manila Midtown Hotel.

In 1990, Velasquez headlined "Narito Ako", her first major concert, which was held at the Folk Arts Theater to promote her second studio album Nineteen 90, and made her North American concert debut at Carnegie Hall in New York City—a first for an Asian solo artist. She signed an international record deal and released the studio albums Listen Without Prejudice (1994), My Love Emotion (1995) and Retro (1996). During this period, Velasquez performed live at various events across Southeast and East Asia, including an appearance as opening and closing act at the Yoshinogari Ruins Music Festival in Saga Prefecture, Kyūshū, Japan. In April 1996, Velasquez staged "Isang Pasasalamat", a concert commemorating her ten-year career, at UPD Sunken Garden. To promote her tenth studio album, R2K (1999), she performed at Regine 2000, a three-day event at the Music Museum. In April 2000, she staged the R2K Concert at the Araneta Coliseum, which was critically acclaimed and earned Velasquez a live entertainment accolade from the Aliw Awards. She also performed a concert at the Westin Philippine Plaza, which was recorded for her first live album, Regine Live: Songbird Sings the Classics (2000). That year, she co-headlined a concert called "Celebration of Love" with Peabo Bryson and Jeffrey Osborne.

Velasquez received the inaugural Favorite Artist Philippines award at the 2002 MTV Asia Awards and performed "Cry" with Mandy Moore to promote the theatrical release of Moore's film A Walk to Remember. In April,  at the National Museum of the Philippines, Velasquez headlined a benefit concert called "One Night with Regine", which was a collaboration with ABS-CBN to benefit Bantay Bata Foundation's child abuse response fund. In the same year, she co-headlined "Two for the Knight", a collaboration with Brian McKnight.  In 2003, Velasquez collaborated with Michel Legrand and staged "Songbird Sings Legrand" at the PICC Plenary Hall. Later that year at Makati's Onstage Theatre, she headlined a  residency show named "Songbird Sings Streisand", which was a tribute to Barbra Streisand.

At the Mall of Asia Arena in November 2012, Velasquez headlined "Silver" but the show was cut short after she lost her voice because of a viral infection—it was re-staged in January 2013. From 2013 to 2016, she co-headlined annual concerts at the Mall of Asia Arena: "Foursome", "Voices of Love", "Ultimate" and "Royals". To promote her seventeenth studio album, R3.0 (2017), she staged a two-night show at the Mall of Asia Arena. In 2020, in support of relief efforts during the COVID-19 pandemic, Velasquez curated virtual benefit concerts "One Night with Regine" for Bantay Bata Foundation and "Regine: Joy From Home" for Jollibee Group Food Aid. She also released the single "Istorya", which she performed at the 25th Asian Television Awards and ASAP Natin 'To.

Headlining concerts

Co-headlining concerts

Concert residencies

Benefit concerts

Notes

References

Citations

Book sources

External links
 Tours of Regine Velasquez at Live Nation

Live performances
Lists of concert tours